Jørgen Nagel Frantzen (9 May 1935 – 10 January 2020) was a Danish rower who competed in the 1952 Summer Olympics. He was born in Holbæk. In 1952 he was the coxswain of the Danish boat which won the bronze medal in the coxed pairs event.

References
Jørgen Frantzen's profile at Sports Reference.com
Jørgen Frantzen's obituary 

1935 births
2020 deaths
Danish male rowers
Coxswains (rowing)
Olympic rowers of Denmark
Rowers at the 1952 Summer Olympics
Olympic bronze medalists for Denmark
Olympic medalists in rowing
Medalists at the 1952 Summer Olympics
People from Holbæk Municipality
Sportspeople from Region Zealand